Mike Roberts may refer to:

Mike Roberts (baseball) (born 1950), American baseball player and coach
Mike Roberts (rugby union, born 1982), rugby union wing for Connacht Rugby
Mike Roberts (mixer) (born 1992), American mixing engineer from Syracuse, New York
Mike Roberts (sportscaster) (1933–2016), sportscaster of KKOB-AM in Albuquerque
Mike Roberts (rugby union, born 1946), Wales international rugby union player

See also
 Michael Roberts (disambiguation)